The following highways are numbered 523:

Canada

United States